Zgornja Vižinga is a village on the left bank of the Drava River in the Municipality of Radlje ob Dravi in Slovenia.

The local church is dedicated to Saint Giles and was first mentioned in written documents dating to the 13th century. The current building was built around 1700 and renovated in 1834. It belongs to the Parish of Radlje.

References

External links
Zgornja Vižinga on Geopedia

Populated places in the Municipality of Radlje ob Dravi